Cromer is a coastal town and civil parish on the north coast of the English county of Norfolk.
The local government authorities are North Norfolk District Council, whose headquarters is on Holt Road in the town, and Norfolk County Council, based in Norwich.

The town is notable as a traditional tourist resort and for the Cromer crab, which forms the major source of income for local fishermen. The motto Gem of the Norfolk Coast is highlighted on the town's road signs.

History

The town has given its name to the Cromerian Stage or Cromerian Complex, also called the Cromerian, a stage in the Pleistocene glacial history of north-western Europe.

Cromer is not mentioned in the Domesday Book of 1086. The place-name 'Cromer' is first found in a will of 1262 and could mean 'Crows' mere or lake'. There are other contenders for the derivation, a north-country word 'cromer' meaning 'a gap in the cliffs' or less likely a direct transfer from a Danish placename.

It is reasonable to assume that the present site of Cromer, around the parish church of Saints Peter and Paul, is what was in 1337 called Shipden-juxta-Felbrigg, and by the end of the 14th century known as Cromer. A reference to a place called Crowemere Shipden can be seen in a legal record, dated 1422, (1 Henry VI), the home of John Gees. The other Shipden is now about a quarter of a mile to the north east of the end of Cromer Pier, under the sea. Its site is marked by Church Rock, now no longer visible, even at a low spring tide. In 1888 a small pleasure steamer called Victoria struck the remains of the church tower, and the rock was subsequently blown up for safety. In the present day, members of Great Yarmouth sub-aqua club dived at the site, and salvaged artefacts from both the medieval church and the wreck of Victoria.

Cromer became a resort in the early 19th century, with some of the rich Norwich banking families making it their summer home. Visitors included the future King Edward VII, who played golf here. The resort's facilities included the late-Victorian Cromer Pier, which is home to the Pavilion Theatre. In 1883 the London journalist Clement Scott went to Cromer and began to write about the area. He named the stretch of coastline, particularly the Overstrand and Sidestrand area, "Poppyland", and the combination of the railway and his writing in the national press brought many visitors. The name "Poppyland" referred to the numerous poppies which grew (and still grow) at the roadside and in meadows.

Cromer suffered several bombing raids during the Second World War. Shortly after one raid, Cromer featured as the location for an episode of An American In England, written by Norman Corwin with the narrator staying in the Red Lion Hotel and retelling several local accounts of life in the town at wartime. The radio play first aired in the United States on 1 December 1942 on the CBS/Columbia Workshop programme starring Joe Julian.

On 5 December 2013 the town was affected by a storm surge which caused significant damage to the town's pier and seafront.

In 2016, the Cromer shoal chalk beds, thought to be Europe's largest chalk reef, were officially designated as a Marine Conservation Zone.

Economy
Traditionally, Cromer was a fishing town. It grew as a fishing station over the centuries, and was a year-round fishery into the 20th century, with crabs and lobsters in the summer, drifting for longshore herring in the autumn and long-lining, primarily for cod, in the winter. The pattern of fishing has changed since the 1980s, and it is now almost completely focused on crabs and lobsters. The town is famous for the Cromer crab, which is now the major source of income for the local fishermen. In 2016, about ten boats plied their trade from the foot of the gangway on the east beach, with shops in the town selling fresh crab, whenever the boats go to sea. By 2018, experienced crabmen were having difficulty attracting young people to the business, perhaps because of the long working hours required during the season. Lobster trapping was also continuing.

Tourism developed in the town during the Victorian period and is now an important part of the local economy. The town is a popular resort and acts as a touring base for the surrounding area. The coastal location means that beach holidays and fishing are important, with the beach and pier being major draws. Visitor attractions within the town include Cromer Pier and the Pavilion Theatre on the pier. Close to the town's pier the RNLI Henry Blogg Museum is housed inside the early 21st century Rocket House. The museum has the Cromer Lifeboat H F Bailey III (ON 777) as its centrepiece and illustrates the history of the town's lifeboats and lifeboatman Henry Blogg's most famous rescues.

The South American themed Amazona zoo park opened to the public in 2006 and is to the south of the town.

Culture and community

For one week in August the town celebrates its Carnival Week. Attractions include the crowning of a 'royal family' including carnival queen, a street parade and a fancy dress competition. The event's 50th anniversary was held in 2019.

Cromer is twinned with Nidda, Germany and Crest, France. The town has an Air Training Corps Squadron and an Army Cadet Force Platoon, based at Cromer High School.

The town has a Friday market and a number of independent retailers in its centre. Cromer Hospital provides services across the North Norfolk area. It includes a minor injuries unit and is run by the Norfolk and Norwich University Hospitals NHS Foundation Trust.

Cromer Museum opened in 1978 and is housed in former fishermen's cottages adjacent to the parish church on Church Street. The museum managed by Norfolk County Council contain items relating to the history of Cromer, including paintings and Poppyland china. It has two permanent galleries on the pioneering photographer, Olive Edis - Britain's first female war photographer. A mock-up of a Victorian cottage and galleries containing geology and fossil remnants of the area which include part of the West Runton Mammoth.

Landmarks
According to palaeontologist Dr James Neenan, from the Oxford University Museum of Natural History, the cliffs are part of a Norfolk coastline area rich in Pleistocene fossils. In 2017 a prehistoric rhino was found in West Runton, dating back 700,000 years to the Cromerian Interglacial.

It features the Pavilion Theatre and dates from 1901. Cromer Lighthouse stands on the cliffs to the east of the town.

The Church of St Peter and St Paul dates from the 14th century and is in the centre of the town. After falling into disrepair it was rebuilt in the late 19th century by architect, Arthur Blomfield. At  the Bell tower is the highest in the county. Also, of note are the vast stained glass windows which commemorate various members of the lifeboat crew and other features of the resort.

The Hotel de Paris was originally built in 1820 as a coastal residence for Lord Suffield. In 1830 the building was converted into a hotel by Pierre le Francois. Norfolk-born architect George Skipper extensively remodelled the building between 1895 and 1896. Today, the hotel which occupies an elevated location overlooking the town's pier still provides accommodation to visitors. Other notable hotels include the 17th century Red Lion Hotel, the Victorian Sandcliff Hotel and the Edwardian Cliftonville Hotel.

Cromer Hall is located to the south of the town in Hall Road. The original hall was destroyed by fire and was rebuilt in 1829 in a Gothic Revival style, by Norfolk architect William John Donthorne. Henry Baring, of the Baring banking family, acquired the estate around this time. Evelyn Baring, 1st Earl of Cromer was born at the hall in 1841. In 2010 the building was the home of the Cabbell Manners family. In 1901, author Arthur Conan Doyle was a guest at the hall. After hearing the legend of the Black Shuck, a ghostly black dog, he is thought to have been inspired to write the classic novel The Hound of the Baskervilles.

The Old Town hall, which was once the main public events venue in the town, was completed in 1890.

Lifeboat station

The fishermen also crewed Cromer's two lifeboats. Most famous of the lifeboatmen was Henry Blogg, who received the RNLI gold medal for heroism three times, and the silver medal four times. Cromer Lifeboat Station was founded in 1804, the first in Norfolk. Rowing lifeboats were stationed there through the 19th century.

In the 1920s a lifeboat station was built at the end of the pier, enabling a motor lifeboat to be launched beyond the breakers. A number of notable rescues carried out between 1917 and 1941 made the lifeboat and the town well known throughout the United Kingdom and further afield. The area covered by the station is large, as there is a long run of coastline with no harbour – Great Yarmouth is 40 miles (65 km) by sea to the south east and the restricted harbour of Wells next the Sea 25 miles (40 km) to the west. Today the offshore lifeboat on the pier performs about a dozen rescues a year, with about the same number for the inshore lifeboat stationed on the beach.

The Duke of Kent officially named the town's new lifeboat, Lester, in a ceremony on 8 September 2008.

Transport
The railway came to Cromer in 1877, with the opening of Cromer High railway station by the Great Eastern Railway. Ten years later, a second station, Cromer Beach, was opened by the Midland and Great Northern Joint Railway, bringing visitors from the East Midlands. The second station, now known simply as Cromer, remains. Direct services were operated from London, Manchester, Leicester, Birmingham, Leeds, Peterborough and Sheffield, but today a service between Norwich and Sheringham on the Bittern Line is all that remains. The closed Cromer tunnel linked the Beach station with the Mundesley line to the east. It was the only railway tunnel to be built in Norfolk.

Bus and coach services are provided by several companies which link the town to destinations including Norwich, Sheringham, Holt, King's Lynn and Cambridge. The A140 links to Norwich, the A148 (direct) and A149 (coast road) to King's Lynn, and the A149 to the Norfolk Broads and Great Yarmouth. The B1159 is a coastal road out towards Mundesley.

The nearest airport is Norwich International Airport.

Education
Cromer Academy is the town's only high school. It educates children aged 11 to 16. For sixth-form education, children travel to Sheringham, Paston College in North Walsham, or Norwich. The town also has a junior school educating children from 5 to 11 years of age, an infants school (Suffield Park infants) and an attached nursery.

Sport and leisure

Cromer has sports clubs and leisure facilities. Situated on the cliffs between the town and Overstrand to the east, the Royal Cromer Golf Club was founded in 1888 and given royal status by the Prince of Wales, one of the founding members, in the same year. The course was originally designed by Old Tom Morris and hosted the British Ladies Amateur Golf Championship in 1905, before which an unofficial match was held between British and American ladies, the first international golf match to be played. The club, which is the second oldest in Norfolk, has hosted PGA events.

Cromer Cricket Club is an English amateur cricket club that is based on The Norton Warnes Cricket Ground on Overstrand Road.
Cromer CC have 2 Saturday senior XI teams that compete in the Norfolk Cricket Alliance League, a Women's softball team in the NCB Women’s Softball Cricket League, and a junior section that play competitive cricket in the Junior Tier Groups of the Norfolk Cricket Alliance League.

Cabbell Park has been the home of Cromer Town F.C. since 1922. The long established club plays in the Premier Division of the Anglian Combination. The town's tennis and squash courts are located at Norwich Road and are open to the public.

The Norfolk Coast Path passes through the town and is also the termination of the Weavers' Way. The  Norfolk Coast Cycleway runs parallel to the coast and passes through a mixture of quiet roads and country lanes to link the town with Kings Lynn to the west and Great Yarmouth in the east.

Sea angling is popular and mixed catches including cod can be made from the town's beaches. The pier provides the opportunity to capture specimen sized bass. Established in 2007, the North Norfolk Surf Lifesaving Club (North Norfolk SLSC) has its clubhouse on the town's main promenade. Surfing is also carried out on the town's beaches close to the pier. Equipment and lessons can be hired in season.

Cultural references

Literature 
The town is featured as a location in the novels Emma by Jane Austen and North and South by Elizabeth Gaskell.

Emma by Jane Austen Chapter XII

North and South by Elizabeth Gaskell Chapter XLIX

Edward Lear includes a limerick about Cromer in his Book of Nonsense.

Film media
In a Monty Python episode first shown in 1970 (Series 2, Episode 9, Skit: Cosmetic Surgery), the name on the "desk" of Professor Sir Adrian Furrows indicates that the character has a B.Sc from, among sundry other places, Cromer.

In The Three Doctors, a 1972–1973 serial in the long-running BBC television series Doctor Who, the doctor's ally, Brigadier Lethbridge-Stewart mistakes the surface of an alien planet for the town, famously uttering, "I'm fairly sure that's Cromer". Actor Nicholas Courtney improvised the line, name-checking the place where he got his first professional job as an actor-cum-assistant stage manager.

The final scenes of the 2013 film Alan Partridge: Alpha Papa were filmed on Cromer Pier.

Filming took place in the town during November 2014 of the BBC 1 series Partners in Crime.

A BBC short fantasy – Wonderland, first aired 1 December 2018, was filmed in Cromer featuring the pier. It depicts the distant personal relationship between a busy mother's lifestyle working with IT bizarrely crossed-over to her son's video-game-driven lifestyle, causing the screens of both to display corrupted fragments of each other's content, and everyone else's real-time frame to freeze, allowing mother and son to enjoy unique quality time together. The musical theme is Emmy the Great’s Lost in You.

Several scenes in the 2018 TV series Angry Birds on the Run were filmed in Cromer.

Music 
The town is referenced in the song Norman and Norma by The Divine Comedy."Norman and Norma got married in Cromer, April 1983"

International relations

Twin towns – sister cities 
  Crest, Drôme, Auvergne-Rhône-Alpes, France
  Nidda, Hesse, Germany

Notable people

 Edward Bach, creator of Bach flower remedies
 Henry Blogg, most decorated lifeboatman of the RNLI.
 Benjamin Bond Cabbell, politician and philanthropist
 Henry "Shrimp" Davies, longest-serving coxswain of the lifeboat
 Emily Wilding Davison, women's rights campaigner.
 James Dyson, creator of Dyson vacuum cleaners
 John Henry Gurney, banker and amateur ornithologist
 John Hurt, veteran actor had a home close to the town
 Charles William Peach, British naturalist and geologist
 Malcolm Sayer, designer for Jaguar cars
 Simon Thomas, television presenter
 Liam Walsh, the boxer is based in the town.
 Charles Mayes Wigg, artist

Freedom of the Town
The following people and military units have received the Freedom of the Town of Cromer.

Individuals
 Anthony "Tony" Shipp: 15 August 2022.

See also
Cromerian Stage
Cromer Ridge
Cromer Shoal Chalk Beds – Natural History 
Cromer, New South Wales – the suburb in Sydney, Australia named after this north Norfolk town

References

Further reading
 Bartell, Edmund, Observations upon the town of Cromer, 1800, accessed on Google Books 2015-08-23
 Leach, Nicholas & Russell, Paul Cromer Lifeboats 1804–2004, Stroud: Tempus Publishing, 2004, 
 Malster, R. The Cromer Lifeboats, 4th ed. Cromer: Poppyland Publishing, 1994, 
 Pipe, C. A Dictionary of Cromer and Overstrand History, 1st ed. Cromer: Poppyland Publishing, 2010, 
 Stibbons, Peter & Cleveland, David Poppyland – Strands of Norfolk History, 4th ed., Cromer: Poppyland, 2001,  (1st ed. 1981)
 Warren, M. Cromer – Chronicle of a Watering Place, 3rd ed. Cromer: Poppyland Publishing, 2001,

External links

Cromer Town Council
Cromer Literary History

 
North Norfolk
Seaside resorts in England
Towns in Norfolk
Port cities and towns of the North Sea
Populated coastal places in Norfolk
Civil parishes in Norfolk
Beaches of Norfolk